Progreso is one of the 38 municipalities of Coahuila, in north-eastern Mexico. The municipal seat lies at Progreso. The municipality covers an area of 1818.3 km².

As of 2005, the municipality had a total population of 3,379.

References

Municipalities of Coahuila